Campaign for Working Families is a conservative political action committee founded in 1998 that focuses on support for traditionalism and free enterprise. While it is a nonpartisan organization, it tends to support Republicans more than Democrats. The campaign is headed by Gary Lee Bauer.

References

Organizations established in 1998
1998 establishments in the United States
United States political action committees
Conservative organizations in the United States